Ulfus Normanus (or Ulf) was a medieval Bishop of Dorchester, when the town was seat of the united dioceses of Lindsey and Dorchester.

Ulf was consecrated in 1049 and was expelled on 14 September 1052.

Citations

References

External links
 

Bishops of Dorchester (Mercia)